The CMD – Costruzioni Motori Diesel S.p.A. (en. Construction Diesel Engines) or more simply CMD is an Italian company that designs, develops, builds and markets marine engines, with its brand FNM Marine.

History
The Company was founded in 1971, under the name Fratelli Negri Macchine Diesel Sud (FNM), on the initiative of the Negri brothers. Initially, the activity focused on the revision of earthmoving machines, then expanding in the mid-70s, in the installation of diesel engines on used cars. Furthermore, towards the end of the decade, collaboration with FIAT began, which still represents an important slice of the company's business. In 2013, indeed, the company signed an agreement to produce engine heads for Maserati and Jeep.

In 1980, the GD 178 AT 1.3 supercharged diesel engine, entirely designed and built by FNM, was presented at the Turin International Motor Show.

In 1991, CMD Costruzioni Motori Diesel was set up, which would acquire the entire FNM business branch and related know-how. In the 1990s, CMD inaugurated the Atella 1 plant, expanding its business producing and selling marine diesel engines. In the 2000s the company opened two new production plants, Atella 2 in 2004 and Morra De Sanctis in 2005. In 2017 67% of the share capital was held by the Chinese Loncin Holdings group, while the remaining 33% was in Italian hands. The official dealer is AS Labruna which is based in Monopoli, Apulia.

Engines
The company builds various types of marine inboard motor including hybrids.

Awards
 Premio ADI (Association for Industrial Design) 2019, at the 59° Salone Nautico di Genova thanks to the engine Blue Hybrid System.

See also
 AS Labruna
 Inboard motor
 Fiat Chrysler Automobiles

References

Propulsion
Marine engineering
Italian brands
Companies based in Campania
Companies based in Basilicata
Engine manufacturers of Italy